Kool-Aid Man is a video game for the Atari 2600 and Intellivision. Both were published by Mattel in 1983 (under the M Network label for the Atari version), but each game is of unique design. They are centered on the Kool-Aid Man, the television mascot of the beverage Kool-Aid.

Initially available exclusively through mail-order, it was later released through traditional retail outlets.

References

External links
Kool-Aid Man at Atari Mania

1983 video games
Advergames
Atari 2600 games
Intellivision games
North America-exclusive video games
Mattel video games
Video games about food and drink
Video games developed in the United States
Works based on advertisements